"Next Exit" is a song by New Zealand art rock group Split Enz. It was written by Tim Finn and released as a non-album single in Australia in March 1983.

An earlier version of "Next Exit", together with one of its B-sides ("Remember When"), was originally recorded as a demo during the Rootin Tootin Luton Tapes sessions in 1978.

Track listing
"Next Exit" - 3:40
"Two of a Kind" - 3:41
"Remember When" - 3:15

Personnel 
 Neil Finn - vocals, guitar, piano
 Tim Finn - vocals, guitar, piano, keyboards
 Noel Crombie - vocals, percussion
 Nigel Griggs - vocals, bass
 Eddie Rayner - keyboards and machines

Charts

References

Split Enz songs
1983 singles
Songs written by Tim Finn
Mushroom Records singles